Lee Shu-chuan (born 1 February 1958) is a Taiwanese politician. He was the deputy mayor of Kaohsiung from 25 December 2018 to 12 June 2020. He previously served in multiple positions within the Taipei County Government, and was Secretary-General of the Executive Yuan from 2014 to 2015, when he was named the Secretary-General of the Kuomintang. He stepped down from that position when his term ended in March 2016.

Early life
Lee obtained his master's degree in electrical engineering from National Taipei University of Technology in 2001. He then joined the National Taiwan University faculty.

Political career
In the mid-2000s, Lee served the Taipei County Government as the director of the New Construction Department. He then led the Taipei County Public Works Bureau before being named a deputy magistrate of Taipei County. After Taipei County was upgraded to the special municipality of New Taipei, Lee's title changed and he kept his post as deputy mayor of New Taipei until February 2014, when he was named Secretary-General of the Executive Yuan. Lee was appointed to the same position in the Kuomintang in January 2015, and stepped down in March 2016. On 15 December 2018, Lee was appointed the second deputy mayor of Kaohsiung in Han Kuo-yu's administration. When Han was recalled in June 2020, Lee left office. On 12 December 2022, Lee was named a deputy mayor of Taipei by Chiang Wan-an.

References

Living people
1958 births
National Taipei University of Technology alumni
Academic staff of the National Taiwan University
Politicians of the Republic of China on Taiwan from Pingtung County
Deputy mayors of Kaohsiung
Deputy mayors of New Taipei
Deputy mayors of Taipei